Burslem railway station was a station on the Potteries Loop Line that served the town of Burslem, Staffordshire. It was located on Moorland Road, adjacent to Burslem Park.  It should have opened with the extension of the Potteries Loop Line from Hanley on 1 November 1873 but the Board of Trade inspector was not satisfied so there was a delay of a month before opening.

The station closed in 1964 when the Loop Line closed.  Most traces of the station have been removed although the old stationmaster's house, known as Station House, is still occupied on a site between the old line and Burslem Park on Moorland Road. The site of the station, sidings etc., is now part of a Greenway for walkers and cyclists running along part of the route of the old Loop Line which has been landscaped.

References

Disused railway stations in Stoke-on-Trent
Railway stations in Great Britain closed in 1964
Railway stations in Great Britain opened in 1873
Former North Staffordshire Railway stations
Beeching closures in England